"More Kiss / Song for You" is the debut single by the Japanese girl idol group Fairies,  released in Japan on September 21, 2011 on the label Sonic Groove (a subsidiary of Avex Group).

It is a double-A-side single.

The physical CD single debuted at number 9 in the Oricon weekly singles chart.

Release 
The single was released in two versions: CD-only and CD+DVD.

Track listing

CD+DVD edition

Charts

Single

"More Kiss"

Awards 

|-
| 2011
| "More Kiss"
| Japan Cable Awards — New Artist 
| 
|-

References

External links 
 Discography on the official website of Fairies

Songs about kissing
2011 debut singles
Japanese-language songs
Fairies (Japanese group) songs
2011 songs
Avex Group singles